Robert Wilkin (1820–1886) was a 19th-century Member of Parliament in Canterbury, New Zealand.

He was a member of the Canterbury Provincial Council.  At first, he represented the Timaru electorate (1860–1862), then the Town of Timaru electorate (1862–1864) and then the Waitangi electorate (1864–1866). From July 1860 to November 1863, and from October 1866 to March 1868, he was a member of the Canterbury Executive Council. He was the province's Deputy Superintendent from 19 July to 14 September 1863.

Notes

References

1820 births
1886 deaths
Members of the New Zealand House of Representatives
Members of the Canterbury Provincial Council
Members of Canterbury provincial executive councils
New Zealand MPs for South Island electorates
19th-century New Zealand politicians